The Saxons were a confederation of Germanic tribes during the Early Middle Ages, and formed part of the merged group of Anglo-Saxons.

Saxon may also refer to:

Places

United States
 Saxon, South Carolina, a census-designated place
 Saxon, West Virginia, an unincorporated community 
 Saxon, Wisconsin, a town 
 Saxon (CDP), Wisconsin, an unincorporated census-designated place within the town 
 Saxon Harbor, a harbor in Wisconsin
 Saxon Boulevard, a road in Volusia County, Florida

Elsewhere
 Saxon, Switzerland, a district of Martigny, canton of Valais
 Saxon River, New Zealand
 Saxon Elbeland, area near a river in Germany
 Saxon Uplands, hilly countryside in Saxony, Germany

Arts and entertainment
 Saxon (band), a British heavy metal band, formed in 1976
 Saxon (album), a 1979 debut album by the band Saxon
 The Saxons, the original name of Scottish pop band Bay City Rollers
 Sky Saxon, a stage name of American rock and roll musician Richard Marsh (1937-2009)
 "Saxon", a song by Chase & Status
 Saxon (film), a 2007 independent British film
 Gar Saxon, a Mandalorian commander in the Star Wars universe
 Harold Saxon, a pseudonym of The Master, an enemy of Doctor Who
 Saxon Garvey, a character in the Australian soap opera Neighbours
 Peter Saxon, house pseudonym used by various thriller writers from the 1950s to the 1970s
 Machinesmith, a Marvel Universe villain born Samuel "Starr" Saxon
 Saxon Greeting, a gymnastic routine performed by women in Nazi Germany
 Saxon World Chronicle, 13th century German universal history
 The Saxon Stories, series of historical novels by Bernard Cornwell

People
 Saxon (given name)
 Saxon (surname)
 Bruno the Saxon, 11th-century German chronicler of the eleventh century
 nickname of Matthew Saxon McEwan, late 19th century Scottish rugby football player
 Alex Saxon, pen name of Bill Pronzini (born 1943), American writer of detective fiction
 Inhabitants of one of three modern states of Germany: Lower Saxony, Saxony and Saxony-Anhalt
 Inhabitants of one of the predecessor states to the modern German states; see Saxony (disambiguation)#Historical German states

Other uses
 Saxon language (disambiguation), various old and modern languages
 Saxon pound, unit of currency in Anglo-Saxon England
 Saxon thaler, historical currency of the Kingdom of Saxony
 Saxon White, a large diamond from India
 Saxon (firework), a ground-based pyrotechnic device
 Saxon (horse), an American racehorse who won the 1874 Belmont Stakes
 Saxon Gold rabbit, a breed of rabbit
 Saxon Colour pigeons, a group of Saxon breeds of fancy pigeons
 Saxon Fairy Swallow pigeon, a breed of fancy pigeon
 Saxon Monk, a breed of fancy pigeon
 Saxon Spot, a breed of fancy pigeon
 Saxon Shield, a breed of fancy pigeon
 Saxon wasp, common social wasp found in Europe and Asia
 Saxon (vehicle), a British Army armoured personnel carrier
 Saxon Motor Car Company, American car maker from 1914 to 1922
 Saxon (automobile), produced from 1913 to 1923
 Saxon Mill, former mill at Guy's Cliffe, Warwickshire, England
 Saxon-Upper Lusatian Railway Company, German railway company
 Saxon math, a mathematics learning program for grades K-12
 Saxon Studio International, London reggae sound system
 Saxon XSLT, an open-source XSLT and XQuery processor
 Alfred Saxons, an American collegiate athletic program
 England Saxons, current name of that country's "A" (second-level) men's national rugby union team
 Transylvanian Saxons, an ethnic German minority in Transylvania, Romania, who settled there from 12th century

See also
 Saxån, a river in Sweden
 Saxen, a district in Austria
 Saxony (disambiguation)